Bonfinópolis is a municipality in central Goiás state, Brazil.  It is located a short distance east of Goiânia and is part of the Goiânia metropolitan area.

The distance to Goiânia is 33 km. and connections are made by BR-457 / GO-010.

Neighboring municipalities are:
north: Goianápolis 
south: Senador Canedo and Caldazinha 
east:  Leopoldo de Bulhões
west:  Goiânia

Population and Political Data
Population density in 2007: 55.16 inhabitants/km2 
Population growth rate from 2001-2007: 3.35.%
Population in 1980: 3,324
Population in 1991: 4,303
Urban population in 2007: 6,167
Rural population in 2007: 577
Eligible voters in 12/2007:  5,764
City government: mayor (Antônio das Graças Filho), vice-mayor (Lázaro da Silva Borges), and 09 councilpersons

Economy
The economy is based on cattle raising (11800 head in 2006), milk production, agriculture, commerce, public administration, and small transformation industries.  There was modest production of oranges, coffee, manioc, rice, and tomatoes. 
(IBGE 2006)

Health
infant mortality in 2000: 27.7
infant mortality in 1990: 28.5
hospitals: 01 (2007)
hospital beds: 20
doctors / nurses / dentists in the public system: 08 / 01 / 0 (2002)

Education
literacy rate in 2000: 85.5
literacy rate in 1991: 74.0
school enrollment in 2006:  2,016 in 4 schools
(IBGE 2006)

HDI: 0.723
State ranking:  163 out of 242 municipalities
National ranking: 2,557 out of 5,507 municipalities

For the complete list see

See also 
 List of municipalities in Goiás

References

Frigoletto

Municipalities in Goiás